At least three ships of the French Navy have borne the name Circé:

 , an unprotected cruiser
 , a  launched in 1907 and sunk in 1918
 , a  launched in 1925. Seized in 1942 by Italy and renamed FR117 and scuttled in 1943

French Navy ship names